Chapmannia reghidensis is a species of flowering plant in the family Fabaceae. It is found only in Yemen. Its natural habitat is subtropical or tropical dry forests. It is threatened by habitat loss.

References

Dalbergieae
Endemic flora of Socotra
Endangered plants
Taxonomy articles created by Polbot